Eckhard Tielscher (born 1 September 1942) is a German volleyball player. He competed in the men's tournament at the 1968 Summer Olympics.

References

1942 births
Living people
German men's volleyball players
Olympic volleyball players of East Germany
Volleyball players at the 1968 Summer Olympics
Sportspeople from Leipzig
20th-century German people